Sinclair Service Station may refer to:

Sinclair Service Station (Tulsa, Oklahoma), listed on the National Register of Historic Places (NRHP) in Tulsa County
Sinclair Service Station (Ridgeland, South Carolina), NRHP-listed
Sinclair Service Station (Spring Hill, Florida), NRHP-listed
Old Sinclair Station, Bryan, Texas, NRHP-listed

See also
List of historic filling stations
Sinclair Building (disambiguation)